Antal Szebeny (6 April 1886 – 18 June 1936) was a Hungarian rower. He competed at the 1908 Summer Olympics and the 1912 Summer Olympics. Three younger brothers, Miklós, György and István, were also Olympic rowers.

References

1886 births
1936 deaths
Hungarian male rowers
Olympic rowers of Hungary
Rowers at the 1908 Summer Olympics
Rowers at the 1912 Summer Olympics
Rowers from Budapest
European Rowing Championships medalists